Qoriniasi Babitu Bale (1941 — 21 March 2014) was a barrister, a solicitor and a politician who served twice as Fiji's Minister for Justice and Attorney-General, most recently from 2001 to 2006, when he was deposed in the military coup of 5 December. Like many of Fiji's most influential leaders, Bale was a native of Levukana Village in Vanua Balavu in the Lau Islands.

Education and early career 
Bale was educated at Queen Victoria School and Suva Boys Grammar School then University of Otago and Victoria University in Wellington, New Zealand, where he graduated with a LLB degree in 1969.  Upon returning to Fiji, he was appointed a Crown Counsel in the Crown Law Office, and subsequently became a Crown Prosecutor in the Office of the Director of Public Prosecutions in 1970.  In 1975, he became Principal Legal Officer in the Crown Law Office, before being promoted to Solicitor General in 1979, a post he held until 1984.  Bale is the first indigenous Fijian Solicitor General; his predecessors had all been from the United Kingdom.

Political career 
Bale had his first foray into politics in 1984, when the Governor General of Fiji appointed him to the Senate at the nomination of Prime Minister Ratu Sir Kamisese Mara. At that time the Senate consisted of 22 members, 7 of whom were nominated by the Prime Minister.  He became Attorney General in the Cabinet, and later that year was also appointed to the newly created position of Minister for Justice.  He retired from politics for the first time following the defeat of the Alliance Party in the general election of 1987.

Following the Fiji coups of 1987, Bale went into private practice as a barrister and a solicitor.  He served as Legal Adviser to the Great Council of Chiefs and the Fijian Affairs Board for 18 years, and as Chairman of the Electoral Commission and the Constituency Boundaries Commission from 1990 to 1996.  Balewas also Chairman of Ratu Sukuna Memorial School from 1988 to 1996, and Chairman of the Council of the Fiji School of Medicine for 10 years.

Following the restoration of democracy to the island nation after the Fiji coup of 2000, Prime Minister Laisenia Qarase appointed Bale to the Senate in September 2001.  One of the 9 out of 32 Senators chosen by the Prime Minister, he found himself holding the portfolios of Attorney-General and Minister for Justice once more.

Policies 
A member of the Soqosoqo Duavata ni Lewenivanua Party (SDL), he was known to have Fijian nationalist sympathies and called for substantial amendments to be made to the Constitution adopted in 1997. This Constitution, which was abrogated in the course of the 2000 coup, was subsequently reinstated in March 2001, following two court rulings.

In May and June 2005, Bale promoted the Reconciliation, Tolerance, and Unity Bill, which proposes the establishment of a Commission with the power, subject to presidential approval, to compensate victims and pardon perpetrators of crimes related to the 2000 coup.

In July 2006, Bale claimed that the Fiji Labour Party had no right to call itself the opposition and appoint shadow ministers. Bale said "as far as the Opposition goes there are only two formal Opposition members while the rest of the FLP members are government back-benchers."

References

External links

2014 deaths
Soqosoqo Duavata ni Lewenivanua politicians
University of Otago alumni
I-Taukei Fijian members of the Senate (Fiji)
Attorneys-general of Fiji
21st-century Fijian lawyers
I-Taukei Fijian people
Politicians from Vanua Balavu
1941 births
20th-century Fijian lawyers